Servant and Mistress is a 1977 French drama film directed by Bruno Gantillon and starring Victor Lanoux and Andréa Ferréol.

Cast
Victor Lanoux as Jérôme
Andréa Ferréol as Maria
Évelyne Buyle as Christine
Gabriel Cattand as Charles
David Pontremoli as Paul
Jean Rougerie as Chef de Cabinet

References

External links
 

French drama films
1970s French films